A pheromone party is a social event attended by singles, in an effort to find their mate through sniffing anonymous pieces of clothing.  The Pheromone Party concept builds on the "sweaty T-shirt experiments" performed by Claus Wedekind. The interactive developer and artist Judith Prays brought the sweaty T-shirt study to a party environment in Brooklyn in 2010. Participants in these parties are told to sleep in T-shirts for three consecutive days. Once collected, the garments are placed in individual bags for singles to smell. If a person finds the smell agreeable, they are introduced to the owner.

See also
 Body odour and sexual attraction

References

External links
Relationship Coach For Couples
video on pheromone parties from The Colbert Report
photoblog on pheromone parties from MSNBC archive on Wayback Machine

Dating
Pheromones
2010 introductions